Robert Peter Macaluso Jr. (born April 16, 1964) is an American college baseball coach who is currently an assistant coach at the University of the Pacific.

Early life and education
Born in Reading, Massachusetts, Macaluso played college baseball at Springfield College and graduated in 1987 with a Bachelor of Science degree in physical education. He later completed a master's degree in physical education at Springfield in 1998.

Coaching career
Macaluso was pitching coach at Melrose High School in Melrose, Massachusetts from 1989 to 1992 and head varsity coach at Weston High School in Weston, Massachusetts from 1993 to 1996. Macaluso also coached an American Legion Baseball team in Reading, Massachusetts from 1988 to 1997. Future major leaguer Jason Bere was among his players.

After two seasons back at Springfield as an assistant in 1997 and 1998, he became head coach at Muhlenberg for eight seasons.  He then became an assistant for Cal State Los Angeles for two seasons, then UC Irvine for six seasons.  While with the Anteaters, UC Irvine reached the 2014 College World Series.  He then became an assistant at Cal State Bakersfield for one season before ascending to the top job.

From 2003-2008, Macaluso managed the Brewster Whitecaps, a collegiate summer baseball team in the prestigious Cape Cod Baseball League.

After he went 19–37 in his only season as head coach, Cal State Bakersfield fired Macaluso in December 2016.

In September 2017, Macaluso joined the staff of Ryan Garko at the University of the Pacific as a volunteer assistant coach.

Head coaching record

References

1964 births
Living people
Baseball players from Massachusetts
Cal State Bakersfield Roadrunners baseball coaches
Cal State Los Angeles Golden Eagles baseball coaches
Cape Cod Baseball League coaches
High school baseball coaches in the United States
Muhlenberg Mules baseball coaches
Pacific Tigers baseball coaches
People from Reading, Massachusetts
Sportspeople from Middlesex County, Massachusetts
Springfield Pride baseball coaches
Springfield Pride baseball players
UC Irvine Anteaters baseball coaches